iCarbonX is a company founded by Chinese genomicist Jun Wang, former CEO of Beijing Genomic Institute (BGI), in 2015. iCarbonX combines genomics with other health factors such as metabolites, bacteria and lifestyle choices to create a digitalized form of life.

History
iCarbonX was founded on October 27, 2015. On September 10, 2016, iCarbonX acquired Imagu Vision Technologies, an Israeli AI and image processing company, in order to establish an iCarbonX-Israel R&D center. On January 5, 2017, iCarbonX announced its Digital Life Alliance with seven other companies including SomaLogic, HealthTell, PatientsLikeMe, AOBiome, GALT, Imagu and Robustnique.

iCarbonX has raised over $600 million in investment. Tencent Holdings Limited – owner of social-media app WeChat – and Zhongyuan Union Cell & Gene Engineering Corp. invested $200 million in iCarbonX, which made iCarbonX one of only three Chinese healthcare startups with a valuation of more than $1 billion (considered a Unicorn). The company has about  100 employees.

On January 5, 2017, iCarbonX released Meum, a digital health management platform. The company name, “iCarbonX,” symbolizes the use of the internet and artificial intelligence to improve life, of which a central element is carbon. The “i” and “X” indicate the company's plans to combine the Internet and artificial intelligence to create something new.

References

Companies based in Shenzhen
Biotechnology companies established in 2015
Biotechnology companies of China
Chinese brands
AI companies